The concept of modern, big and self-service store came to Romania in mid-1990s. Since mid-2000s, there has been a strong growth in the number of supermarkets in the country, particularly in Bucharest and other main urban areas. Almost all supermarkets are owned by multinational companies. This is a list of major retailers in Romania in 2022.

See also
List of supermarket chains

References

Romania

Supermarkets